Willie Ross (2 May 1919 – 1990) was a Scottish professional footballer who played as a centre forward.

Career
Born in Glasgow, Ross played for Yoker Athletic, Arbroath, Bradford City and Portadown.

His son Trevor was a professional footballer, playing for Arsenal and Everton.

References

1919 births
1990 deaths
Scottish footballers
Yoker Athletic F.C. players
Arbroath F.C. players
Bradford City A.F.C. players
Portadown F.C. players
Scottish Football League players
English Football League players
Association football forwards